Weatherford may refer to:

Cities and towns 

 Weatherford, Oklahoma, small city in Custer County
 Weatherford, Texas, medium city in Parker County

People 
 Jack Weatherford, American professor, ethnographer, and anthropologist
 James K. Weatherford (1850–1935), American lawyer and politician
 Mary Weatherford (born 1963), American artist
 Sterling Weatherford (born 1999), American football player
 Steve Weatherford (born 1982), American football punter
 Will Weatherford (born 1979), American politician

Other uses 

 Weatherford College, a college in Weatherford, Texas
 Weatherford Hall, a dormitory at Oregon State University named after James K. Weatherford
 Weatherford International, an oilfield services company